Senger David Peralta Guerreiro (born August 14, 1987) nicknamed "Freight Train" is a Venezuelan professional baseball outfielder for the Los Angeles Dodgers of Major League Baseball (MLB). He made his MLB debut in 2014 with the Arizona Diamondbacks, where he won the Silver Slugger Award in 2018 and the Gold Glove Award in 2019. The Diamondbacks traded Peralta to the Tampa Bay Rays in 2022.

Early life
David Peralta was born on August 14, 1987 in Valencia, Venezuela where he grew up with two sisters, Ivonne and Erika. His father is also named David Peralta, and his mother is Diocelina Peralta.

Career

Early career
Peralta started his career as a pitcher in the St. Louis Cardinals organization, having signed with the team in 2004 for a $35,000 bonus. After numerous injuries and two shoulder surgeries, the Cardinals released Peralta in May 2009. 

Peralta then played as an outfielder in independent baseball for the Rio Grande Valley WhiteWings, Wichita Wingnuts, and Amarillo Sox.

Arizona Diamondbacks

On July 3, 2013, Peralta signed with the Arizona Diamondbacks.

Peralta was called up to the majors for the first time on June 1, 2014. He made his major league debut that day. He tied a Diamondbacks record by recording 7 multi-hit games in his first 15 games, hitting .328 with one home run and two RBIs. 2015 was a breakout season for Peralta, who hit .312 and racked up 17 home runs and an NL-leading 10 triples as the Diamondbacks' primary left fielder.

Peralta played in 48 games for the Diamondbacks in 2016, hitting .251/.295/.433 with 4 home runs and 43 hits in 171 at-bats. In 2017 with Arizona, Peralta played in 140 games for the club, batting .293/.352/.444 with 154 hits and 14 home runs in 525 at-bats. In 2018, Peralta hit .293/.352/.516 in 146 games for the Diamondbacks, with a career high 164 hits and a career high 30 home runs. Peralta was awarded the Silver Slugger award at the end of the season. In 2019, Peralta batted .275/.343/.461 in 99 games for Arizona, with 105 hits and 12 home runs. He was awarded the Gold Glove award at the end of the season. Peralta would continue his success offensively in the 2020 season, hitting an even .300 with 5 home runs and finishing second on the team in RBI with 34. 

On May 14, 2021, Peralta made his pitching debut, allowing 3 runs in an inning during a blowout loss versus the Washington Nationals. In the appearance, he notched his first major league strikeout, punching out Nationals outfielder Yadiel Hernández. In 2021, Peralta batted .259/.325/.402 with 8 home runs and 63 RBIs. He was tied for the major league lead with eight triples.

Tampa Bay Rays
On July 30, 2022, Peralta was traded to the Tampa Bay Rays in exchange for Christian Cerda.  Peralta singled twice on October 1, 2022, versus Cristian Javier of the Houston Astros to earn his 1,000th career hit.

Los Angeles Dodgers
On February 16, 2023, Peralta signed a one-year, $6.5 million contract with the Los Angeles Dodgers.

Personal life
Peralta's wife Jordan gave birth to their first child in August 2017.

See also

 List of Major League Baseball annual triples leaders
 List of Major League Baseball players from Venezuela

References

External links

David Peralta at Pura Pelota (Venezuelan Professional Baseball League)

1987 births
Living people
2023 World Baseball Classic players
Amarillo Thunderheads players
Arizona Diamondbacks players
Arizona League Diamondbacks players
Bravos de Margarita players
Gold Glove Award winners
Johnson City Cardinals players
Major League Baseball outfielders
Major League Baseball players from Venezuela
Mobile BayBears players
Rio Grande Valley WhiteWings players
Silver Slugger Award winners
Sportspeople from Valencia, Venezuela
Tampa Bay Rays players
Venezuelan expatriate baseball players in the United States
Visalia Rawhide players
Wichita Wingnuts players